Alaksiej Janukievich (born June 30, 1976) is a Belarusian politician and leader of the Partyja BNF political party.

Biography 
Janukievich graduated from the Belarusian State Economic University in 1997.

Since 1996, he has been a member of the Partyja BNF, holding senior positions in the party since 1999.

Janukievich was also one of the founding members of Malady Front.

In October 2009 Alaksiej Janukievich was elected head of the Partyja BNF.

Awards 
 I Love Belarus (2010)

References

External links
 Official Bio

1976 births
Living people
Politicians from Minsk
BPF Party politicians
Belarus State Economic University alumni